Manuel Armanqué Feliu (14 February 1901 – 14 August 1985) was a Spanish water polo player. He competed in the men's tournament at the 1920 Summer Olympics.

Notes

References

External links
 

1901 births
1985 deaths
Spanish male water polo players
Olympic water polo players of Spain
Water polo players at the 1920 Summer Olympics
Water polo players from Barcelona
20th-century Spanish people